Lady Margaret Crawford was the mother of the Scottish patriot William Wallace, and mentioned as a daughter of Hugh Crawford by Blind Harry. 
Born Dunfermline and final resting place grounds of Dunfermline Abbey marked by a plaque under a tree.
Harry mentions Wallace's parentage in his poem The Wallace.

References

William Wallace
13th-century Scottish women